This is a list of the symbols of the states and territories of Australia. Each state and territory has a unique set of official symbols, as well as the national symbols of Australia.



States

Territories

See also

 Australian state colours
 National colours of Australia
 National symbols of Australia
 List of Australian bird emblems
 List of Australian mammal emblems
 States and territories of Australia

Notes

References

Symbols
States and territories symbols
Australian states and territories
 
Australia